Merrylands railway station is located on the Main South line, serving the Sydney suburb of Merrylands. It is served by Sydney Trains T2 Inner West & Leppington and T5 Cumberland line services.

History
Merrylands station opened on 6 July 1878.

In 1969, the Merrylands Road level crossing to the south of the station was replaced by the Mombri Street overpass to the north. In 1972, the signal box at Merrylands closed with operations transferred to Granville signal box. On 2 November 1996, the Merrylands to Harris Park Y-Link opened allowing direct train operation between these two stations by what is now known as the Cumberland Line.

The station was upgraded in 2006, with lifts added for easy access.

Until at least the mid-1990s, sidings existed to the north-west of the station to serve a flour mill.

Platforms & services

Transport links
Merrylands Bus Interchange

Stand 1: Transit Systems Sydney
809: to Pemulwuy via Hilltop and South Wentworthville, then continues to Parramatta via route 811/811X
818: to Westmead via South Wentworthville

Stand 2: Transit Systems Sydney
806: to Liverpool via Greystanes, Prairiewood and Abbotsbury
810 and 810X: to Parramatta via Pemulwuy, Greystanes, South Wentworthville No difference between 810 and 810X until South Wentworthville

Stand 4: Transdev NSW
908: to Bankstown via Auburn

Stand 4 Transit Systems Sydney
802: to Liverpool via Guildford West, Fairfield, Canley Heights, Bonnyrigg, Miller and Cartwright 
804: to Liverpool via Guildford West, Fairfield, Greenfield Park, Hinchinbrook
820: to Guildford station via Bristol Street
822: 2 weekday offpeak services to Guildford station via Railway Tce

Bus in Merrylands Road Transit Systems Sydney
802: to Parramatta via Pitt Street
804: to Parramatta via Pitt Street
806: to Parramatta via Pitt Street

Merrylands station is served by one Nightride route:
N60: Fairfield station to City (Town Hall)

References

External links

Merrylands station details Transport for New South Wales

Easy Access railway stations in Sydney
Railway stations in Sydney
Railway stations in Australia opened in 1878
Main Southern railway line, New South Wales
Cumberland Council, New South Wales